Manuel Pablo García (born 11 November 1980) is an Argentinian retired footballer who played primarily as forward.

Club career
García started his career in the youth team of Racing Club de Avellaneda, and made his professional Argentine Primera División debut in 2000. In the summer of 2003 he was loaned to Polish I liga site Legia Warsaw. He made his league debut in 0–0 draw against Górnik Łęczna on 16 August 2003. Playing for the club in 2003–04 season García made 12 league appearances without any goal scored. Since 2004 he has represented numerous clubs in lower leagues of Argentine and Italy, retiring from football in 2012 after short spell at CB Ramón Santamarina.

References

External links
 
 Manuel Pablo García at calciatori.com 
 

Living people
1980 births
Argentine footballers
Association football forwards
Argentine expatriate footballers
Atlético Tucumán footballers
A.S.D. Riccione 1929 players
Legia Warsaw players
Club y Biblioteca Ramón Santamarina footballers
Matera Calcio players
Racing Club de Avellaneda footballers
San Martín de San Juan footballers
Ekstraklasa players
Argentine Primera División players
Primera Nacional players
Expatriate footballers in Poland
Expatriate footballers in Italy
Argentine expatriate sportspeople in Poland
Argentine expatriate sportspeople in Italy